The Jane Pauley Show was an American syndicated talk show packaged by NBC Universal, hosted by veteran journalist Jane Pauley. The show premiered on August 30, 2004.

Pauley and other people involved with the show, before its premiere, were not aware of how she would adapt to the medium. Pauley has shown that she can handle serious interviews (from her experience on Today and Dateline NBC), but it was not immediately evident if she could hold her own in a medium which is heavily laden with impersonality.

The show's ratings were not impressive, and the show was canceled, with the final episode airing in May 2005.

The show was broadcast from Studio 8G in 30 Rockefeller Center, which had formerly housed a succession of syndicated talk shows including The Phil Donahue Show, The Rosie O'Donnell Show, and The Caroline Rhea Show. Studio 8G was also previously home to The Today Show for a period in the late 1970s and early 1980s.

References

External links
 Article on Pauley's uncertainty in the new medium

2004 American television series debuts
2005 American television series endings
Jane Pauley Show, The
Jane Pauley Show
Jane Pauley Show, The